UFC Fight Night: Te Huna vs. Marquardt (also known as UFC Fight Night 43) was a mixed martial arts event held on June 28, 2014, at Vector Arena in Auckland, New Zealand.

Background
The event was the first that the organization hosted in New Zealand, it took place at the Vector Arena in Auckland.

The event was the first of two that took place on June 28, the other being UFC Fight Night: Swanson vs. Stephens.

Anthony Perosh was expected to face Gian Villante at the event.  However, Perosh was forced out of the bout with an injury and was replaced by Sean O'Connell.

Cláudio Silva was expected to face Neil Magny at the event but was forced out of the bout with an injury and was replaced by promotional newcomer and former Jungle Fight Welterweight Champion Rodrigo de Lima.

Richie Vaculik was expected to face Jon Delos Reyes at the event.  However, Reyes was forced from the bout with an injury and replaced by promotional newcomer Roldan Sangcha-an.

Results

Bonus awards
The following fighters were awarded $50,000 bonuses:
 Fight of the Night: Gian Villante vs. Sean O'Connell
 Performance of the Night: Nate Marquardt and Charles Oliveira

See also

2014 in UFC
List of UFC events

References

UFC Fight Night
Mixed martial arts in New Zealand
Sport in Auckland
2014 in mixed martial arts
2014 in New Zealand sport
June 2014 sports events in New Zealand